Juan López de Padilla (1490 – 24 April 1521) was an insurrectionary leader in the Castilian War of the Communities, where the people of Castile made a stand against policies of the Holy Roman Emperor Charles V and his Flemish ministers.

Life
Padilla was born in Toledo, Spain, the eldest son of the commendator of Castile. In 1520, after the Castilian deputies had demanded in vain Charles V's return to Castile, regard for cortes' rights and the administration of their economy by Spaniards, a "holy junta" was formed with Padilla as its head. At first, the junta attempted to establish a national government in the name of Juana of Castile, but lost the support of the nobility when it abolished their privileges and asserted democracy. Though the nobles' army subsequently captured Tordesillas, Padilla led the capture of Torrelobatón and other towns, but any advantage gained was neutralized by the junta after it granted an armistice. When hostilities resumed, their army was comprehensively defeated near Villalar, on 23 April 1521 and Padilla taken prisoner. He was publicly beheaded the following day.

Afterwards, Padilla's wife, Doña María Pacheco, defended Toledo against the royal troops for six months, but ultimately was compelled to take refuge in Portugal.

Eponyms
Juan de Padilla high school, in Illescas, Toledo.
Juan de Padilla street, in Aranda de Duero, Burgos
Juan de Padilla street, in Burgos
Juan de Padilla street, in Málaga
Juan de Padilla street, in Sevilla
Juan de Padilla street, in Torrejón de la Calzada, Madrid

Further reading 
 Sandoval, Historia de Carlos V., Pamplona: 1681.
 E. Armstrong, The Emperor Charles V., 1902.
 A. Rodriquez Villa, Juana la Loca, Madrid: 1892.
 Pero Mejia, "Comunidades de Castilla", in the Biblioteca de autores españoles of Rivadeneyra, vol. xxi.

References

Sources 
 

1490 births
1521 deaths
People from Toledo, Spain
Spanish rebels
People executed by Spain by decapitation
Executed Spanish people
16th-century executions by Spain
People of the Revolt of the Comuneros